The W.H. Bickel Estate is a 2½ story stone mansion built between 1928 and 1930 on the outskirts of Parkersburg, West Virginia. The  building has a rectangular main section and a wing to the East. It is known for its architecture and a ghost that reportedly haunts the area. The main house is rich with woodwork, including intricately inlaid walnut and maple floors with geometric patterns, wood mantels, partial wainscoting on all three floors, 15 light French doors on the first floor, solid maple arched doors on the second floor, built-in china cabinets, crown molding in all main rooms, and original finish wood casement windows with roll down screens and brass hardware. There are five gas fireplaces with marble or stone hearths in the main house and two staircases, including a circular walnut and maple main staircase. The ceilings are coved on the second and third floors, and the third floor contains a ballroom or “dance hall” stretching twenty eight feet.

The exterior is 4½” stone veneer quarried in Philadelphia and applied with a special mortise technique. The circular drive arrives at a matching stone portico with a tongue and groove ceiling and Spanish tile porch. The roof is tile with a hip and valley on the wing side and a hip roof on the rectangular side. There are half-moon windows emerging from the tiled roof that provide side lighting to the upstairs rooms.

The grounds are equally impressive with a stone carriage house, stone entrance pillars, two stone fountains (one about thirty feet in diameter with a fountain head once capable of a 50' fountain spray, and the second fountain contains within it a hand-carved sandstone sculpture of a mill with a waterwheel), matching stone flower boxes, and a pair of fighting lions carved from sandstone.  Behind the main house is a wooden barn that was sold from the main property and converted to four apartments, but which has been repurchased and rejoined with the main property.

In its prime, the Bickel Estate was a showplace, with the sweeping grounds rising to the knoll that hosts the house.  At Christmas time, the entire property would be lighted with everything from the colored lights glowing through the 50' spray of the large fountain to the giant Christmas tree lighted by the main house.  In the summertime, the fountains flowed among vast gardens of flowers lining the winding drive to the portico.  “Gazing Balls” also adorned the front and side landscapes and the landscape was always immaculate and seasonal.

The property once was the center of a  property that contained unique features such as a ½ mile horse track with grandstands and a large zoo.  Today, the property maintains a noble stature in what has developed as a residential and light commercial area.

Due to the work of one of the new owners, the Bickel Estate was added to the List of Registered Historic Places in West Virginia in 2001. The Bickel Mansion is located near the intersection of WV-95 and Marrtown Road in South Parkersburg.

See also
 High Gate
 Sonnencroft

References

Landmarks in West Virginia
Houses on the National Register of Historic Places in West Virginia
Tudor Revival architecture in West Virginia
Houses completed in 1930
Houses in Parkersburg, West Virginia
Reportedly haunted locations in West Virginia
National Register of Historic Places in Wood County, West Virginia